Frank Dudbridge is Professor of Statistical Genetics in the Department of Health Sciences at the University of Leicester, where he has worked since 2016. His research focuses on the fields of statistical genetics and genetic epidemiology as they relate to common human diseases. Before joining the University of Leicester, he served first as a senior statistician at the MRC Biostatistics Unit at the University of Cambridge, then as Reader and Professor of Statistical Genetics at the London School of Hygiene and Tropical Medicine.

References

External links
Faculty page

Living people
Statistical geneticists
Genetic epidemiologists
Alumni of King's College London
Alumni of Imperial College London
Academics of the University of Leicester
Academics of the University of Cambridge
Academics of the London School of Hygiene & Tropical Medicine
Year of birth missing (living people)